In metric geometry, the space of directions at a point describes the directions of curves that start at the point. It generalizes the tangent space in a differentiable manifold.

Definitions
Let (M, d) be a metric space. First we define the upper angle for two curves starting at the same point in M. So let  
The upper angle between them at p is

The upper angle satisfies the triangle inequality: For three curves  starting at p,

A curve is said to have a direction if the upper angle of two copies of itself at the starting point is zero. For curves which have directions at a point, we define an equivalence relation on them by saying that two curves are equivalent if the upper angle between them at the point is zero. Two equivalent curves are said to have the same direction at the point.

For an Alexandrov space with curvature bounded either above or below, there is also a similar definition in which shortest paths, which always have directions, are used. The space of directions at a point is then defined as the metric completion of the set of equivalence classes of shortest paths starting at the point.

References

Metric geometry